The 1990–91 Elitserien was the 57th season of the top division of Swedish handball and the first under that name. 12 teams competed in the league. The league was split into an autumn league and a spring league. The eight highest placed teams in the autumn league qualified for the spring league. HK Drott won the regular season and also won the playoffs to claim their seventh Swedish title.

League tables

Autumn

Spring

Playoffs

Quarterfinals 
 LUGI HF–IK Sävehof 25–20
 IK Sävehof–LUGI HF 25–24
 LUGI HF–IK Sävehof 24–18
LUGI won series 2–1

 Redbergslids IK–Ystads IF 23–27
 Ystads IF–Redbergslids IK 21–17
Ystads IF won series 2–0

Semifinals 
 LUGI HF–HK Drott 19–21
 HK Drott–LUGI HF 24–20
HK Drott won series 2–0

 Irsta HF–Ystads IF 27–28
 Ystads IF–Irsta HF 17–18
 Irsta HF–Ystads IF 22–20
Irsta HF won series 2–1

Finals 
 HK Drott–Irsta HF 22–20
 Irsta HF–HK Drott 17–19
 HK Drott–Irsta HF 23–15
HK Drott won series 3–0

References 

Swedish handball competitions